Maritimimonas is a Gram-negative and aerobic genus of bacteria from the family of Flavobacteriaceae with one known species (Maritimimonas rapanae). Maritimimonas rapanae has been isolated from the gut of the whelk Rapana venosa from the South Sea in Korea.

References

Flavobacteria
Bacteria genera
Monotypic bacteria genera
Taxa described in 2009